Matéo Bohéas (born 9 October 1996) is a French Paralympic table tennis player. He won silver in the Men's individual class 10 at the 2020 Summer Paralympics in Tokyo.

References

External links
 
 

Living people
1996 births
Sportspeople from Nantes
French male table tennis players
Paralympic table tennis players of France
Table tennis players at the 2016 Summer Paralympics
Table tennis players at the 2020 Summer Paralympics
Medalists at the 2020 Summer Paralympics
Paralympic silver medalists for France
21st-century French people
20th-century French people